Ding Laihang (born September 1957) is a general of the Chinese People's Liberation Army Air Force (PLAAF) who served as Commander of People's Liberation Army Air Force from 2017 to 2021. Prior to that, he was commander of the Shenyang Military Region Air Force and then commander of the Northern Theater Command Air Force.

Biography
Ding was born in September 1957 in Hangzhou, Zhejiang Province. He became regimental commander of Regiment 71 of 24th Fighter Aviation Division while in his early 30s. From the position of division deputy commander he moved to command of a training base in the Beijing Military Region Air Force, a divisional unit. Like Ma Zhenjun, he emphasized combat-realistic "Red versus Blue" training.

In 2001, he was swiftly promoted to chief of staff of the 8th Corps, deployed on the Taiwan Front, reaching the deputy corps level at the age of 44. When the 8th Corps was reorganized down to the Fuzhou Forward Commanding Post in 2003, Ding was its founding head. In 2007 he was promoted to be president of PLA Air Force Command Academy. A year later he was transferred to the Chengdu Military Region Air Force as its chief of staff. Ding was one of the youngest senior officers among the seven PLAAF Military Regions (at the full corps rank).

In August 2012, Ding was promoted to commander of the Shenyang Military Region Air Force, as well as Deputy Commander of the Shenyang MR.  In February 2016, he was appointed the inaugural Air Force commander and deputy commander of the Northern Theater Command, which was newly established in Xi Jinping's military reform. In August 2017, he was promoted to commander of the PLA Air Force, succeeding General Ma Xiaotian.

Ding attained the rank of major general in July 2003, and lieutenant general (zhong jiang) in July 2013. He was a member of the 11th National People's Congress. In October 2017, he was elected as a member of the 19th Central Committee of the Communist Party of China. On 31 July 2019 he was promoted to General.

References 

1957 births
Living people
People's Liberation Army generals from Zhejiang
Commanders of the People's Liberation Army Air Force
People from Hangzhou
Delegates to the 11th National People's Congress
Members of the 19th Central Committee of the Chinese Communist Party